Robert Glenn Moorman (June 22, 1814 – October 5, 1873) was a  South Carolina planter and politician.

Family
Parents - Thomas Samuel Moorman (1775 – 1818) & Jemima Glenn Sims born 1786
Sister - Elizabeth D. Moorman born 1818, wife of Reuben Sims Chick
First Wife - Mary L. Kenner died 1845, daughter of Samuel Eskridge Kenner (1772? - February 2, 1844)  & Lucy Goree (1783? - September 17, 1873)
Child with Mary - Thomas Samuel Moorman (March 24, 1842 – August 4, 1902), lawyer and Librarian of the South Carolina Supreme Court in the 1890s
Second Wife - Virginia C. Harrington (July 19, 1829 – March 17, 1861), daughter of Young John Harrington (April 5, 1784 - November 11, 1850) & Nancy Berry Calmes (August 5, 1786 - May 29, 1879) 
Children with Virginia:
Mary Adelaide Moorman (1853 – 1898)
Elizabeth Theresa Moorman (1855 – June 27, 1877)
Robert Glenn Moorman, Jr. (November 15, 1857 – October 10, 1896)
Nancy H. Moorman born 1858

Robert was grandfather of Thomas Samuel Moorman (February 7, 1875 – June 28, 1936) - Colonel U.S. Army
Great-grandfather of Thomas Samuel Moorman (July 11, 1910 –  December 23, 1997) – Lt. Gen USAF, Superintendent United States Air Force Academy 1965 - 1970
Great-great-grandfather of Thomas S. Moorman Jr. - General USAF

Government and military service
 South Carolina House of Representatives 1848 - 1852
 South Carolina Senate 1852 - 1855, resigned due to poor health, later served 1864    - 1865
 In October 1865 lost to Col. James H. Williams in race for State Senate representing Newberry District by vote of 401 to 369.
 Lt. Col. on staff of S.C. Gov. John Hugh Means 1852 - 1854
 Signed S.C. Secession document as delegate to the Ordinance of Secession Convention in December, 1860 representing Newberry County, South Carolina with Simeon Fair, John P. Kinard &  Joseph Caldwell
 Member of the South Carolina Soldier's Board of Relief 1861 - 1864
 Second Lt. South Carolina Volunteers, 3rd Regiment, C.S.A.

General information

Robert Moorman owned a large plantation near Maybinton, Newberry County, South Carolina, where he also bred horses. He was an ardent States' Rights supporter. He was not a college graduate, liked dancing and was a devoted Christian of the Methodist faith. After moving to the town of Newberry, South Carolina from Maybinton in 1866, he was a business partner with Albert G. (Bert) Maybin and brothers Reuben Sims Chick (also Moorman's brother-in-law) and Pettus Wales Chick in a Newberry, South Carolina mercantile company named Moorman & Maybin. He also owned a grocery in Mollohon Row in Newberry. He was a  Director of Newberry National Bank 1871. he died at his home in Newberry on October 5, 1873, buried Rosemont Cemetery, Newberry, South Carolina. His tombstone inscription is: "Mark the perfect man and behold the upright for the end of that man is peace"

References
Sources
 Pope, Thomas H., The History of Newberry County, South Carolina, Vol. II 1860-1990, 1992, University of South Carolina Press 
 O'Neall, John Belton Annals of Newberry 1858, updated by John A. Chapman 1892 

Notes

External links
South Carolina Ordinance of Secession

Moorman, Robert Glenn
Moorman, Robert Glenn
1814 births
1873 deaths
People from Newberry County, South Carolina
American planters
19th-century American politicians
Methodists from South Carolina